Canoeing at the 1980 Summer Olympics was held in the Krylatskoe Canoeing and Rowing Basin, located at the Krylatskoye Olympic Sports Complex (Krylatskoye district, Moscow). The canoeing schedule began on 30 July and ended on 2 August. 11 canoeing events were contested.

Medal summary

Men's events

Women's events

Medal table

Participating nations
179 canoeists from 23 nations competed

References

 
1980
1980 Summer Olympics events